The 1999 FIA GT Homestead 3 Hours was the eighth round the 1999 FIA GT Championship season.  It took place at the Homestead-Miami Speedway, Florida, United States, on September 26, 1999.

This event was originally intended to share the weekend with a United States Road Racing Championship event.  However, the USRRC championship was cancelled midway through the season, leaving the FIA GT Championship to run on their own.  In order to increase the number of participants for the FIA GT event, as well as to allow USRRC teams to compete, a National GT (N-GT) designation was used for cars which had run in the USRRC's GT2 and GT3 classes.  This would be the first time the FIA GT Championship used two classes of cars since the end of the 1998 season, and the cancellation of GT1.

Cars running in the N-GT class would not be eligible for points in the FIA GT Championship.

Official results
Class winners are in bold.  Cars failing to complete 70% of winner's distance are marked as Not Classified (NC).

Statistics
 Pole position – #1 Viper Team Oreca – 1:34.442
 Fastest lap – #1 Viper Team Oreca – 1:22.597
 Average speed – 143.426 km/h

References

 
 

H
FIA GT Homestead